Robert Samuel Simpson (born November 17, 1956) is a Canadian former professional ice hockey forward who played 175 games in the National Hockey League for the Atlanta Flames, Pittsburgh Penguins, and St. Louis Blues.

Early life 
Simpson was born in Caughnawaga, Quebec. As a youth, he played in the 1968 and 1969 Quebec International Pee-Wee Hockey Tournaments with a minor ice hockey team from Caughnawaga.

Career 
Simpson played three years of major junior hockey in the QMJHL for the Sherbrooke Castors and had a ten-year career as a professional. Drafted as the fourth overall pick in the WHA Amateur Draft, Bobby Simpson still went on to play in the NHL instead where he was the twenty-eighth draft pick. During his three years in the QMJHL, Simpson collected 245 points and another 64 at the NHL level.

Personal life 
Simpson is also a full-blood Native American from the Mohawk band near Kahnawake.

Career statistics

Regular season and playoffs

References

External links
 

1956 births
Living people
Atlanta Flames draft picks
Atlanta Flames players
Baltimore Skipjacks players
Canadian ice hockey forwards
Canadian Mohawk people
Erie Blades players
First Nations sportspeople
Ice hockey people from Quebec
Indianapolis Checkers players
Indianapolis Racers draft picks
Muskegon Mohawks players
People from Montérégie
Peoria Rivermen (IHL) players
Pittsburgh Penguins players
Saginaw Lumber Kings players
Salt Lake Golden Eagles (CHL) players
Sherbrooke Castors players
St. Louis Blues players
Tulsa Oilers (1964–1984) players